Mù Cang Chải is a town and the capital of the Mù Cang Chải District of Yên Bái Province, in the northeastern region of Vietnam.

References

Populated places in Yên Bái province
District capitals in Vietnam
Townships in Vietnam